The Minnesota Geological Survey is a unit of the Newton Horace Winchell School of Earth Sciences at the University of Minnesota.

History
The Minnesota Geological Survey was established by the Minnesota State Legislature in 1872 as the Geological and Natural History Survey of Minnesota, and Newton Horace Winchell was appointed as its director.

Citations

References

External links
 Depth of Bedrock in Minnesota (2018, EN)

Geology of Minnesota
Geological surveys